Marcelo Ribeiro dos Santos, known as Marcelo Ribeiro or simply Marcelo (born 27 July 1997), is a Brazilian professional footballer who plays as a forward for San Fernando CD.

Club career
On 6 August 2021, he joined Gil Vicente in Portugal on a two-year contract.

He made his Primeira Liga debut for Gil Vicente on 15 August 2021 in a game against Portimonense.

On 10 January 2022, he joined Indian Super League club SC East Bengal on loan from Gil Vicente.

Career statistics

Club

References

External links
 

1997 births
People from Santo André, São Paulo
Footballers from São Paulo (state)
Living people
Brazilian footballers
Association football forwards
Associação Atlética Portuguesa (Santos) players
Burgos CF footballers
UD San Sebastián de los Reyes players
Gil Vicente F.C. players
East Bengal Club players
San Fernando CD players
Segunda División B players
Primeira Liga players
Brazilian expatriate footballers
Expatriate footballers in Spain
Brazilian expatriate sportspeople in Spain
Expatriate footballers in Portugal
Brazilian expatriate sportspeople in Portugal
Brazilian expatriate sportspeople in India
Indian Super League players
Expatriate footballers in India